Daniel Diaz may refer to:

Cata Díaz (Daniel Alberto Díaz, born 1979), Argentine footballer
Daniel Diaz (boxer) (born 1984), Nicaraguan boxer
Daniel Díaz (cyclist) (born 1989), Argentine cyclist
Daniel Martin Diaz (born 1967), American artist
Daniel Díaz Maynard (c. 1934–2007), Uruguayan lawyer and politician
Daniel Díaz Torres (1948–2013), Cuban film director
Daniel Vázquez Díaz (1882–1969), Spanish painter
Daniel Orlando Díaz (born 1948), Chilean footballer